Gowlland Tod Provincial Park is a provincial park in British Columbia, Canada. The park protects 1,219 hectares (3,012 acres) of mixed forest of Douglas-fir, Arbutus, western redcedar, western hemlock, shore pine, grand fir, red alder, and Garry oak within the District Municipality of Highlands and the Juan de Fuca Electoral Area. Rocky outcroppings support Manzanita, Scotch broom, and Oregon grape. Farther north, the park curves around inland, bounded to the north by the municipality of Central Saanich. The park also encompasses the rural community of Willis Point. Trails connect to Mount Work Regional Park and Lone Tree Hill Regional Park.

References

External links
 Photographs of the park

Provincial parks of British Columbia
Saanich Peninsula
Year of establishment missing